Jimmy Laureys (born 7 July 1981) is a Belgian powerlifter and strongman competitor.

Biography
Jimmy was known as ‘King Kong’ at school due to his size. He began training seriously at the age of 15 and by 17 was powerlifting. When he was 23 he turned his attention to strength athletics.

Although podium showings in 2001 and 2002 in the Strongest Man in Flanders contests showed Jimmy's potential as a strongman, he concentrated on powerlifting until 2005. From that point forward he began to compete in the Benelux strongman circuit consistently being in the top four in almost every contest he entered, winning 3 of the 8 contests he entered in 2005, predominantly in the Netherlands, with similar success in 2006. His competitive nature led to his nickname in Belgium and Holland becoming 'the Belgian Beast'.

By 2008 he had become Belgian's Strongest Man and he repeated this feat in 2009. 2008 also saw his career graduate to the full international status, with an invitation to compete in the Strongman Champions League. He impressed enough to be invited back in 2009 where he was more consistent, and his improvement was such that he achieved a third-place finish in the Spanish leg of the League in October behind Ervin Katona and eventual League Champion Andrus Murumets.

In 2009, in what was described as the strongest field for many years, Laureys was invited to the World's Strongest Man, being the first Belgian to have the honour. He was drawn in the same group as two previous title holders, Phil Pfister and five times winner Mariusz Pudzianowski. They finished in the top two spots and Laureys failed to qualify for the final. In 2010 he once again was the strongest man of Belgium.

Jimmy has been dominating the Belgian competition since the first Belgium's Strongest Man, and is expected to continue doing so for the next couple of years.

General stats
Leg press max weight: 800 kg
Bench press max weight: 230 kg
Squat max: 345 kg
Dead lift max: 400 kg
Log lift max weight:  180 kg

Competition Record
 2001
 2.  - Flander's Strongest Man
 2002
 2.  - Flander's Strongest Man
 2008
 11. Strongman Champions League Varsseveld
 9. Strongman Champions League Wilno
 1.  - Belgium's Strongest Man
 2009
 1.  - Belgium's Strongest Man
 Q.  - 2009 World's Strongest Man
 3. Strongman Champions League Spain
 6. Strongman Champions League Overall
 2010
 1.  - Belgium's Strongest Man
 2011
 1.  - Belgium's Strongest Man
 2012
 1.  - Belgium's Strongest Man

References

External links
 Jimmy Laureys - official site

Belgian strength athletes
1981 births
Living people
Sportspeople from Sint-Niklaas